Ernest Taylor (2 September 1925 – 9 April 1985) was an English footballer who played for four clubs in a 19-year professional career.

After Blackpool's defeat by Newcastle United in the 1951 FA Cup Final, it is said that Stanley Matthews told his manager, Joe Smith, that he would like the Magpies' inside-right in the Blackpool team. On 10 October that year, Taylor signed for Blackpool for £25,000.

Born in Sunderland, County Durham, in 1925, Taylor was a naval submariner when he joined Newcastle in 1942. At only 5 ft 4 in, he was one of the shortest players in the game, but his defence-splitting passes caused problems amongst the opposition. It was his back-heel that set up one of Jackie Milburn's goals in the 1951 Final.

Taylor signed for Blackpool on 10 October 1951 and made his debut three days later in a 2–1 home loss to Charlton. When Matthews had recovered from an injury, the pair created a well-respected right-wing partnership. On 25 November 1953, Walter Winterbottom employed the same partnership in England's match against Hungary. England lost 6–3 in what was Taylor's only appearance for his country.

Earlier in 1953, he had been a member of Blackpool's famous FA Cup-winning side that beat Bolton Wanderers. In the same competition in 1958, he helped the devastated Manchester United to an albeit unsuccessful appearance in the FA Cup Final soon after the Munich air disaster.

On 12 December 1958 Taylor signed for Sunderland for £6,000, and later played for Altrincham and Derry before emigrating to New Zealand, where he coached New Brighton and also played for Auckland club East Coast Bays.

Notes

References

External links
 
 England profile at TheFA.com
 Profile at EnglandFC.com

1925 births
1985 deaths
Footballers from Sunderland
English footballers
England international footballers
Association football forwards
Hylton Colliery Welfare F.C. players
Newcastle United F.C. players
Blackpool F.C. players
Manchester United F.C. players
Sunderland A.F.C. players
Altrincham F.C. players
Derry City F.C. players
English Football League players
Royal Navy personnel of World War II
Royal Navy submariners
FA Cup Final players